Ervin Schiffer (born 1932, Balassagyarmat, Hungary, died July 2014, Antwerp, Belgium)  was a Hungarian born violist and pedagogue. He has played as a part of the Haydn Quartet and the Tahor Quartet. He also played viola in the Dekany Quartet, the predecessor-group to the Haydn Quartet.

As a teacher he was very influential, teaching amongst others at the Amsterdam Conservatory and La Chapelle Royale (Brussels). Many if not all of these institutions' current staff were at some point formed by Mr. Schiffer. He and his wife, violinist Katy Sebestyen were co-founders and the artistic heart of the Cours International de Musique (Morges, Switzerland).

References

External links
The Chapel Hill Chamber Music Workshop
Morges International Summer Master Classes

1932 births
2014 deaths
Hungarian classical violists
20th-century classical musicians
20th-century violists